Kasane may refer to:

 Kasane, a town in Botswana
 Kasane Airport in Botswana
 Kasane, Bhiwandi, a village in India
 Kasane (manga), a Japanese comic series
Kasane Teto, an UTAU